Lomographa anoxys is a moth in the family Geometridae first described by Wehrli in 1936. It is found in China, Taiwan, India, Nepal, Thailand, Peninsular Malaysia and the Philippines.

References

Moths described in 1879
Lomographa
Moths of Asia